Glann ar Mor distillery is a French whisky distillery located in Pleubian, Côtes-d'Armor, Brittany.

History 
Glann ar Mor was created in 1997 by Celtic Whisky Compagnie, with the first single malt whisky produced in December 1999. In its present form, Glann ar Mor has been operational since June 2005, bottling its first unpeated single malt in late 2008. In November 2009, the first peated single malt (about 30-35 ppm of phenol) was sold under the brand of Kornog ("West Wind" in Breton). The distillery is located on the seafront (Glann ar Mor means "At the edge of the sea" in Breton). Bottles feature the Héaux de Bréhat Lighthouse.

Whiskies 
 Glann ar Mor: Unpeated single malt
 Kornog: Peated single malt

References 

Distilleries in France
Food and drink companies established in 1999
French companies established in 1999
French whisky